Moradabad (also Romanized as Morādābād) is a village in Teshkan Rural District, Chegeni District, Dowreh County, Lorestan Province, Iran. At the 2006 census, its population was 43, in 12 families.

References 

Towns and villages in Dowreh County